Balraj Chauhan is the first Vice Chancellor of Dharmashastra National Law University, Jabalpur in India.

Before joining the University, Chauhan served as Director, Amity Law School, Lucknow , Vice Chancellor of Dr Ram Manohar Lohia National Law University, Lucknow and also served as the founding Vice Chancellor of NLIU, Bhopal. He has completed degree in Law from Faculty of Law, University of Lucknow.

References

Living people
Academic staff of Dr. Ram Manohar Lohiya National Law University
Place of birth missing (living people)
Year of birth missing (living people)